The given name Orly may refer to:

 Orly Castel-Bloom, (born 1960), Israeli author
 Orly Goldwasser (b. ?), Israeli Egyptologist
 Orly Levy, Israeli politician
 Orly Mercado Philippine TV host and former senator
 Orly Orlyson, Icelandic space entrepreneur
 Orly Silbersatz Banai, Israeli actress
 Orly Taitz, dentist and lawyer
 Orly Weinerman, Israeli actress